Chadiwal is a village in Sirsa District of Haryana State, India. It is said to have been settled in 1896 AD by a Muslim named Chadi Khan. But there is evidence of its settlement before 1896 AD in Bai-Bhat (a person who has the lineage of a particular gotra of the village) of Beniwal gotra. In this village mainly residents of Beniwal, Godara, Saharan, Bhattu and Birda gotra of Jat caste are more. People of Brahmin, Harijan and Valmiki caste also reside in the village.

History

According to the ancient story, Sardara Beniwal started living in Chadiwal from Bhojasar village of Rajasthan's Bhadra tehsil. But Muslim people from the nearby village Ali-Muhammad used to rob and harass the villagers, so Sardara brought his relative brother Keshu Beniwal from Jatan village of Rajasthan and settled here in 1839 AD and also gave half of his agricultural land. The descendants of Sardara are called Bhojsaria and the descendants of Keshu are called Jatania.

Agriculture

Almost all the land in the village is cultivable and most of the people are associated with agriculture. Irrigation is done by canal and tube well.

Life status

The living standard of the people of the village is very good, there is no lack of literacy among the people and equal attention is given to the education and upbringing of girls.

Key People

Chaudhary Bhagwan Singh was the Sarpanch of village continuously 5 term  and once was also the chairman of the block samiti.

Chaudhary Mansukh Beniwal was the first person to join the Indian Air Force.He took part in the Nagaland Operation and the 1948 Indo-Pak War. He was also a poet of a high order.

Chadudhary K.C. Beniwal was the first engineering graduate of Chadiwal and later become senior lecturer in Sirsa polytechnic. He was an knowledgeable person. He also worked for welfare of poor and needy people. He was also first person to start horticulture in sandy area.

Mangeram Beniwal is the first person from the village to crack the Haryana Civil Services Examination.He is currently working on the post of DM in Hafed.

Shri Arjun was the first sarpanch from Backward Class . He known for his honesty and simple living.

Smt. Saroj Beniwal was the first lady sarpanch in village history.

Pradeep Beniwal is the first IITian from the village. He graduated from IIT Kharagpur in 2010.

Sachin Beniwal is the first merchant navy engineer of the village.

Kalliram Valmik is a famous dhol and bean player of the village. He had played the bean in the program of All India Radio Rohtak.

'Aman Beniwal'' is the first civil engineer architecture of the village.

References

http://www.geonames.org/6697551/chadiwal.html
http://www.geonames.org/6697552/8th_mile.html

Haryana